An autoclave is a machine used to carry out industrial and scientific processes requiring elevated temperature and pressure in relation to ambient pressure and/or temperature. Autoclaves are used before surgical procedures to perform sterilization and in the chemical industry to cure coatings and vulcanize rubber and for hydrothermal synthesis. Industrial autoclaves are used in industrial applications, especially in the manufacturing of composites.

The autoclave was invented by Charles Chamberland in 1879, although a precursor known as the steam digester was created by Denis Papin in 1679. The name comes from Greek auto-, ultimately meaning self, and Latin clavis meaning key, thus a self-locking device.

Uses 
Sterilization autoclaves are widely used in microbiology and mycology, medicine and prosthetics fabrication, tattooing and body piercing, and funerary practice. They vary in size and function depending on the media to be sterilized and are sometimes called retort in the chemical and food industries.

Typical loads include laboratory glassware, other equipment and waste, surgical instruments, and medical waste.

A notable recent and increasingly popular application of autoclaves is the pre-disposal treatment and sterilization of waste material, such as pathogenic hospital waste.  Machines in this category largely operate under the same principles as conventional autoclaves in that they are able to neutralize potentially infectious agents by using pressurized steam and superheated water. A new generation of waste converters is capable of achieving the same effect without a pressure vessel to sterilize culture media, rubber material, gowns, dressings, gloves, etc. It is particularly useful for materials which cannot withstand the higher temperature of a hot air oven.

Autoclaves are also widely used to cure composites, especially for melding multiple layers without any voids that would decrease material strength, and in the vulcanization of rubber. The high heat and pressure that autoclaves generate help to ensure that the best possible physical properties are repeatable.

Other types of autoclaves are used to grow crystals under high temperatures and pressures. Synthetic quartz crystals used in the electronics industry are grown in autoclaves. Packing of parachutes for specialist applications may be performed under vacuum in an autoclave, which allows the chutes to be warmed and inserted into their packs at the smallest volume.

A thermal effluent decontamination system functions as a single-purpose autoclave designed for the sterilization of liquid waste and effluent.

Air removal 
It is very important to ensure that all of the trapped air is removed from the autoclave before activation, as trapped air is a very poor medium for achieving sterility. Methods of air removal include:

Downward displacement (or gravity-type): As steam enters the chamber, it fills the upper areas first as it is less dense than air. This process compresses the air to the bottom, forcing it out through a drain which often contains a temperature sensor. Only when air evacuation is complete does the discharge stop. Flow is usually controlled by a steam trap or a solenoid valve, but bleed holes are sometimes used. As the steam and air mix, it is also possible to force out the mixture from locations in the chamber other than the bottom.
Steam pulsing: Air dilution by using a series of steam pulses, in which the chamber is alternately pressurized and then depressurized to near atmospheric pressure.
Vacuum pumps: A vacuum pump sucks air or air/steam mixtures from the chamber.
Superatmospheric cycles: Achieved with a vacuum pump. It starts with a vacuum followed by a steam pulse followed by a vacuum followed by a steam pulse. The number of pulses depends on the particular autoclave and cycle chosen.
Subatmospheric cycles: Similar to the superatmospheric cycles, but chamber pressure never exceeds atmospheric pressure until they pressurize up to the sterilizing temperature.

Stovetop autoclaves used in poorer or non-medical settings do not always have automatic air removal programs. The operator is required to manually perform steam pulsing at certain pressures as indicated by the gauge.

In medicine 

A medical autoclave is a device that uses steam to sterilize equipment and other objects. This means that all bacteria, viruses, fungi, and spores are inactivated. However, prions, such as those associated with Creutzfeldt–Jakob disease, and some toxins released by certain bacteria, such as Cereulide, may not be destroyed by autoclaving at the typical 134 °C for three minutes or 121 °C for 15 minutes and instead should be immersed in sodium hydroxide (1N NaOH) and heated in a gravity displacement autoclave at 121 °C for 30 min, cleaned, rinsed in water and subjected to routine sterilization. Although a wide range of archaea species, including Geogemma barosii, can survive and even reproduce at temperatures found in autoclaves, their growth rate is so slow at the lower temperatures in the less extreme environments occupied by humans that it is unlikely they could compete with other organisms. None of them are known to be infectious or otherwise pose a health risk to humans; in fact, their biochemistry is so different from our own and their multiplication rate is so slow that microbiologists need not worry about them.

Autoclaves are found in many medical settings, laboratories, and other places that need to ensure the sterility of an object. Many procedures today employ single-use items rather than sterilizable, reusable items.  This first happened with hypodermic needles, but today many surgical instruments (such as forceps, needle holders, and scalpel handles) are commonly single-use rather than reusable items (see waste autoclave). Autoclaves are of particular importance in poorer countries due to the much greater amount of equipment that is re-used. Providing stove-top or solar autoclaves to rural medical centers has been the subject of several proposed medical aid missions.

Because damp heat is used, heat-labile products (such as some plastics) cannot be sterilized this way or they will melt. Paper and other products that may be damaged by steam must also be sterilized another way. In all autoclaves, items should always be separated to allow the steam to penetrate the load evenly.

Autoclaving is often used to sterilize medical waste prior to disposal in the standard municipal solid waste stream. This application has become more common as an alternative to incineration due to environmental and health concerns raised because of the combustion by-products emitted by incinerators, especially from the small units which were commonly operated at individual hospitals. Incineration or a similar thermal oxidation process is still generally mandated for pathological waste and other very toxic or infectious medical waste. For liquid waste, an effluent decontamination system is the equivalent hardware.

In dentistry, autoclaves provide sterilization of dental instruments.

In most of the industrialized world medical-grade autoclaves are regulated medical devices. Many medical-grade autoclaves are therefore limited to running regulator-approved cycles. Because they are optimized for continuous hospital use, they favor rectangular designs, require demanding maintenance regimens, and are costly to operate. (A properly calibrated medical-grade autoclave uses thousands of gallons of water each day, independent of task, with correspondingly high electric power consumption.)

In research
Autoclaves used in education, research, biomedical research, pharmaceutical research and industrial settings (often called "research-grade" autoclaves) are used to sterilize lab instruments, glassware, culture media, and liquid media. Research-grade autoclaves are increasingly used in these settings where efficiency, ease-of-use, and flexibility are at a premium. Research-grade autoclaves may be configured for "pass-through" operation. This makes it possible to maintain absolute isolation between "clean" and potentially contaminated work areas. Pass-through research autoclaves are especially important in BSL-3 or BSL-4 facilities.

Research-grade autoclaves—which are not approved for use in sterilizing instruments that will be directly used on humans—are primarily designed for efficiency, flexibility, and ease-of-use. They display a wide range of designs and sizes, and are frequently tailored to their use and load type. Common variations include either a cylindrical or square pressure chamber, air- or water-cooling systems, and vertically or horizontally opening chamber doors (which may be electrically or manually powered).

In 2016, the Office of Sustainability at the University of California, Riverside (UCR) conducted a study of autoclave efficiency in their genomics and entomology research labs, tracking several units' power and water consumption. They found that, even when functioning within intended parameters, the medical-grade autoclaves used in their research labs were each consuming 700 gallons of water and 90 kWh of electricity per day (1,134MWh of electricity and 8.8 million gallons of water total), because they consumed energy and water continuously, even when not in use.  UCR's research-grade autoclaves performed the same tasks with equal effectiveness, but used 83% less energy and 97% less water.

Quality assurance

In order to sterilize items effectively, it is important to use optimal parameters when running an autoclave cycle. A 2017 study performed by the Johns Hopkins Hospital biocontainment unit tested the ability of pass-through autoclaves to decontaminate loads of simulated biomedical waste when run on the factory default setting. The study found that 18 of 18 (100%) mock patient loads (6 PPE, 6 linen, and 6 liquid loads) passed sterilization tests with the optimized parameters compared to only 3 of 19 (16%) mock loads that passed with use of the factory default settings.

There are physical, chemical, and biological indicators that can be used to ensure that an autoclave reaches the correct temperature for the correct amount of time. If a non-treated or improperly treated item can be confused for a treated item, then there is the risk that they will become mixed up, which, in some areas such as surgery, is critical.

Chemical indicators on medical packaging and autoclave tape change color once the correct conditions have been met, indicating that the object inside the package, or under the tape, has been appropriately processed. Autoclave tape is only a marker that steam and heat have activated the dye. The marker on the tape does not indicate complete sterility. A more difficult challenge device, named the Bowie-Dick device after its inventors, is also used to verify a full cycle. This contains a full sheet of chemical indicator placed in the center of a stack of paper. It is designed specifically to prove that the process achieved full temperature and time required for a normal minimum cycle of 134 °C for 3.5–4 minutes.

To prove sterility, biological indicators are used. Biological indicators contain spores of a heat-resistant bacterium, Geobacillus stearothermophilus. If the autoclave does not reach the right temperature, the spores will germinate when incubated and their metabolism will change the color of a pH-sensitive chemical. Some physical indicators consist of an alloy designed to melt only after being subjected to a given temperature for the relevant holding time. If the alloy melts, the change will be visible.

Some computer-controlled autoclaves use an F0 (F-nought) value to control the sterilization cycle. Since exact temperature control is difficult, the temperature is monitored, and the sterilization time adjusted accordingly.

Additional images

References

Laboratory equipment
Medical equipment